Olinda Elementary is an elementary-level school located in Brea, California.

History 
Olinda Elementary was first built in 1898 in what is now Carbon Canyon Regional Park, one year after the village of Olinda was founded.

Relocation 
The school was moved deeper into Carbon Canyon during the mid-1960s, in what is now Olinda Village.

In 2012, the Olinda Village location was scheduled for demolition and a new site was constructed at a location on Birch Street next to the City of Brea's Sports Park. This sparked concern and anger with local residents as the school had also served as a park, but was made inaccessible after being sold.

Awards 
In 2006, the school was recognized as a California Distinguished School and in 2007 was recognized as a Blue Ribbon School.

In 2010, the Orange County Register placed Olinda Elementary on their "Best Schools" list at number 10.

References 

Brea, California
Public elementary schools in California
1898 establishments in California
Educational institutions established in 1898